Deutsche Internationale Schule Changchun is a German international school in Changchun, Jilin, China. It serves years 1–10.

As of 2016 it has 11 full-time employees and four part-time teachers for 70 students. It was officially recognized as a German school in 2008.

References

External links
 Deutsche Internationale Schule Changchun 

German international schools in China
Education in Changchun